Tommaso Marolda (born 14 January 1981) is an Italian former footballer and football manager.

Biography
Born in Venosa, Basilicata, Marolda started his career at Italian regional/non-professional teams. After a high goalscoring record from 2001 to 2007 in Eccellenza Basilicata and Serie D, Marolda joined his first fully professional team, Teramo, in 2007, and scored 13 goals in Serie C2. In the next season, he joined Taranto but only scored once in Lega Pro Prima Divisione. In 2009, he was signed by Viareggio and was the top scorer of the team in the 2010–11 season with 6 goals, higher than Cristian Longobardi (4 goals) and Riccardo Bocalon (5 goals), but the latter two only played half-season for the team. On 28 July 2011, he left with Viareggio and joined Fano.

After announcing his retirement as a player, he joined Fabrizio Castori as a match analyst at the serie B side Cesena. In 2018, he joined SSC Bari as assistant manager.

References

External links
 Viareggio Profile (2010–11) 
 Football.it Profile 
 
 

Italian footballers
A.S. Melfi players
Alma Juventus Fano 1906 players
S.S. Teramo Calcio players
Taranto F.C. 1927 players
F.C. Esperia Viareggio players
Santarcangelo Calcio players
Pol. Olympia Agnonese players
Fermana F.C. players
Avezzano Calcio players
Serie C players
Serie D players
Association football forwards
People from Venosa
1981 births
Living people
Sportspeople from the Province of Potenza
Footballers from Basilicata
A.C. Sangiustese players